Major General John Taylor Holmes  (born 22 July 1949) is a former British Army officer who served as Director Special Forces from 1999 to 2001, which included command of Operation Barras in September 2000.

Military career
Holmes was commissioned into the Scots Guards in 1970. In 1972 he was awarded the Military Cross for service in Northern Ireland. He transferred to 22 Special Air Service in 1974 and was commanding officer of the Regiment from 1989 to 1992. He then commanded the Airborne Brigade for three years. He worked for the Supreme Allied Commander Europe before being appointed Director Special Forces in 1999. He was promoted to major general in 2001 and became General Officer Commanding 4th Division before retiring in 2002.

Retirement
In 2002, he joined Inkerman, a security and risk management company. He is a Director of Erinys International, and the founder Titon International UK. Maj-Gen Holmes joined the British Syrian Society (BSS) in January 2018. The BSS was set up, and is run, by Fawaz Akhras, the British-based father-in-law of President Bashar al-Assad. "It doesn’t mean I support the actions of President Assad and the Syrian government", Holmes told The Sunday Times. "I believe in dialogue . . . Perhaps it [the BSS] is not the ideal vehicle for that, but at the moment it’s the only vehicle".

References

|-

1949 births
Living people
British Army major generals
British military personnel of The Troubles (Northern Ireland)
Companions of the Distinguished Service Order
Officers of the Order of the British Empire
Recipients of the Military Cross
Scots Guards officers
Special Air Service officers